Raghunandan (literally, "son of Raghu") is a name of Rama, the legendary king of Ayodhya in India. Rama, who is considered to be an incarnation of Lord Vishnu, was a descendant of the king Raghu.

Raghunandan may also refer to:

 Raghunandana (c. 16th century CE), a Sanskrit scholar from Bengal
 Raghunandan Lal Bhatia (born 1921), Indian politician from Punjab; Governor of Bihar
 Raghunandan Swarup Pathak (1924–2007), 18th Chief Justice of India
 Raghunandan Sharma (Mandsaur) (born 1946), Indian politician from Madhya Pradesh
 Raghunandan Sharma (Rajgarh) (1950), Indian politician from Madhya Pradesh
 Raghu Nandan Mandal (1952–2016), Indian politician from Bihar
 Raghunandan Singh Bhadauria (born 1962), Indian politician from Uttar Pradesh
 Raghunandan Panshikar (born 1963), Indian classical vocalist
 Raghunandan Rao (born 1968), Indian politician from Telangana
 N. R. Raghunanthan, Indian film score composer

See also 
 Raghunandan Sharma (disambiguation)